Henry Ramos may refer to:

 Henry J. Ramos (born 1950), Philippine professor of physics
 Henry Ramos Allup (born 1943), Venezuelan politician and lawyer
 Henry Ramos (baseball) (born 1992), Puerto Rican baseball outfielder